European Engineer (EUR ING) is an international professional qualification and title for highly qualified engineers used in over 32 European countries. Contemporary EUR ING engineers are degree-qualified and have gained the highest level of professional competencies through training and monitored professional practice experience.  EUR ING engineers are characterised by their ability to develop appropriate solutions to engineering problems, using new or existing technologies, through innovation, research, creativity and change. They might develop and apply new technologies, promote advanced designs and design methods, introduce new and more efficient production techniques, marketing and construction concepts, pioneer new engineering services and management methods.

The title is pre-nominal, i.e. it is placed before, rather than after, the name as in the case of a post-nominal title such as that for academic degrees (however, in some European countries, academic degrees are also pre-nominal). It is displayed in uppercase with no punctuation (EUR ING).

Qualification 
The title is granted after successful application to a national member of Engineers Europe which includes representation from many European countries, including much of the European Union. 
In providing an acceptable common and highly professional standard, the European Engineer requires proven experience and competency in the application of scientific knowledge, level of professional skill, safety and environmental consciousness, sense of responsibility and the ability to communicate within the level of supervision received and given. A substantial number of years of formation and practice, consisting of an accredited engineering degree, further advanced training, and extensive responsible professional experience, is required by Engineers Europe for the EUR ING title. This is defined in the EUR ING standard for
professional engineering competence (EUR ING Spec).

Recognition of the qualification and title are generally not specifically incorporated into national law. In all cases approval is only after peer review by the appropriate national engineering society. The EU Directive 89/48/EEC generally exempts a bearer from additional examination in the European Union. Names are also placed on the EUR ING Register maintained by Engineers Europe in addition to national member registers.

Ireland and the UK 
In Ireland and the United Kingdom, the Chartered Engineer title (8-12 year qualification process) is a prerequisite requirement for an application for the EUR ING title. In the United Kingdom the Privy Council has approved the use of the title, which can be displayed on a British passport.

France 
In France, it is the association Engineers and Scientists of France (IESF) which manages the applications for the attribution of the title of European Engineer (EUR ING) with Engineers Europe. A Masters level engineering degree recognised by the state (Bac+5), together with a minimum of five years of experience and training is required for the application of the EUR ING title to Engineers Europe.

Germany 
In Germany for the application of EUR ING, a Bachelors and Masters Degree in engineering is required along with the relevant training and experience consisting of the seven years formation required by Engineers Europe. Qualified engineers must also be a member of an engineering association such as VDI, VDE or another member of German Association of Technical and Academic Societies (DVT), the technical and scientific association representing professional engineering in Germany.

Belgium 
In Belgium a Master of Engineering degree together with further years of postgraduate experience and training is required for the application of the EUR ING title. This is achieved through the Committee of Belgian Engineers (Comité des Ingénieurs Belges, CIBIC).

Greece 
In Greece a Master of Science in Engineering (5-year course leading to a Diploma/Dipl.Ing) from a university together with at least two further years of postgraduate experience and training in relevant roles as an Engineer is required for the application of the EUR ING title. This is achieved through the Technical Chamber of Greece (Τεχνικό Επιμελητήριο Ελλάδος, ΤΕΕ) after an application and examination of all required specifications.

Engineers Europe also requests that the School of Engineering be accredited by a EUR-ACE Seal of Excellence. In the French-speaking part of Belgium (Wallonia) it is the responsibility of AEQES, the agency for the Evaluation of the Quality of Higher Education of the Wallonia-Brussels Federation (also known as the "French Community of Belgium") to request and obtain this European reference certification.

See also
 Regulation and licensure in engineering 
 British professional qualifications
 European Chemist
 European professional qualification directives
Professional Engineer

References

External links
Engineers Europe
EUR ING Professional Engineers group on LinkedIn
 EUR ING / FEANI group on Xing
EUR ING professional registration - Engineering Council UK
European Economic and Social Committee (EESC) - FEANI and the EUR ING professional qualification

Engineering